Khanlar Mosque is located in Baku, Azerbaijan. It is one of the religious monuments in Old City.

History 
The mosque was constructed by order of Khanlarov brothers in 19th century. It was constructed according to the plan of Mashadi Mirza Gafar Ismayilov.

The mosque has a shape of elongated quadrangle was integrated into a row with residential areas, near Hanlarov brother's apartment. The entrance is divided into 3 equal parts. The pattern of floral ornaments is decorating the outer side of the mosque.

See also
 Islam in Azerbaijan
 List of mosques in Azerbaijan

References 

Mosques in Baku
19th-century mosques
Icherisheher